Air ambulances in the United States are operated by a variety of hospitals, local government agencies, and for-profit companies. Medical evacuations by air are also performed by the United States Armed Forces (for example in combat areas, training accidents, and United States Coast Guard rescues) and United States National Guard (typically while responding to natural disasters).

Cost
In 2002, the federal government increased the reimbursement for medical flights for Medicare and Medicaid patients. This caused an increase in the number of for-profit ambulance services, which charge much higher rates than non-profit hospitals and expanded services available to people with private health insurance. With lower reimbursements, hospitals could still operate the service as a loss leader because severely injured patients would be incurring significant charges for medical treatment. NPR cited one 2008 case where two patients were transported from the same accident scene to the same hospital, where the hospital charged $1,700 and the private service charged $13,000.

List of air ambulances

 Acadian Ambulance & Air Med Services – Headquartered in Lafayette, Louisiana, covers most of the state of Louisiana and parts of western Mississippi.
 AirCare – with CHI Health Good Samaritan. - The first Nebraska air-medical transport service outside of Omaha, NE. In continuous operation since 1982. Covering all of central Nebraska and north Kansas. 
 Air Evac Lifeteam – the largest medical transport program under one name, covers Alabama, Arkansas, Georgia, Illinois, Indiana, Iowa, Kentucky, Mississippi, Missouri, Ohio, Oklahoma, Tennessee, Texas and West Virginia. Also operates Texas LifeStar in Central Texas.
 AirLife Georgia (Air Methods Corporation) – Serving the state of Georgia and surrounding states. AirLife Georgia is accredited by CAMTS.
 Airlift Northwest - non-profit program of the University of Washington School of Medicine and Harborview Medical Center serving Washington, Idaho, Montana, and Alaska.
 AirMed International – Based in Birmingham, Alabama
 Air Methods – Largest US air ambulance operator under a single FAA part 135 certificate.
 AMR Air Ambulance – Provides domestic and international air medical transportation using specially equipped fixed wing aircraft.
 ARCH Air Medical Service – Missouri, Illinois, and the surrounding regions.
 Boston MedFlight – Headquartered in Bedford, Massachusetts Boston MedFlight transports emergency patients
 Calstar (California Shock Trauma Air Rescue) is a nonprofit regional air ambulance company serving California and northern Nevada.
 CareFlite – a 501c not-for-profit that is based in Dallas Texas area and sponsored by Baylor Scott & White Hospitals, Parkland Hospital, THR hospitals, JPS Hospital, and Methodist Hospitals.
 Carolina Aire Care - Carolina Air Care is a CAMTS accredited critical care and emergency transportation agency serving North Carolina and surrounding areas. Headquartered in Chapel Hill, NC is a nonprofit regional air ambulance.
 CareFlight – serves the Dayton, Ohio region and a  radius to serve much of Southwest Ohio. Based at Miami Valley Hospital
 Critical Air Medicine – Doing business as Critical Air, is based in San Diego, California
EastCare – University Health Systems of Eastern Carolina owned, and operates in Eastern North Carolina
 Flight for Life – many bases of operation across the United States
 Life Flight – Air ambulance based out of the Memorial Hermann Hospital- Texas Medical Center in Houston, Texas.
Life Flight Network – Largest non-profit air ambulance in the US, serving Oregon, Washington, Idaho, and Montana.
 LifeNet, Inc. – Based in Texarkana, Texas with operations also out of Hot Springs, Arkansas.
 UT Lifestar - Based out of University of Tennessee Medical Center in Knoxville, Tennessee. Operates from 5 bases in the East Tennessee region. 
 Maryland State Police Aviation Command – division focusing on medical evacuation operations. Aviation also supports ground units of the state and local police. Funding comes from vehicle registration fees.
Medflight – Based out of Columbus, Ohio.
Mercy Flights – Medford, Oregon. Was the first successful air ambulance in the country, is non-profit. Serves mainly Southern Oregon and Northern California;  radius for helicopter, and almost anywhere West of the Rocky Mountains for the fixed wing airplane, within  of Medford.
Metro Life Flight – Cleveland, Ohio, run by MetroHealth, serves the Northeast Ohio area. Operates both air and ground services.
Omniflight Charleston – Air ambulance service in South Carolinaand part of Georgia.
Superior Ambulance in Elmhurst Illinois serves IL, IN, WI, MI 
STAT Medevac – based in Pittsburgh, Pennsylvania
Survival Flight – Ann Arbor, Michigan – CAMTS certified critical care transport program of Michigan Medicine, provides rapid and safe transport of critically ill and injured patients of any age group.
Trauma Hawk Aero-Medical Program – Palm Beach County, Florida taxpayer funded – trauma transport only
Travis County STAR Flight – Austin, Texas – Public emergency helicopter service for Travis County and surrounding areas.
 University of Wisconsin MedFlight

See also
 Air ambulances in Canada
 Air ambulances in the United Kingdom
 Emergency Aviation in the United Kingdom (disambiguation)
 International SOS, Provider of air ambulance evacuation & repatriation services
 Medical escort
 Medical evacuation

References

Air ambulance services in the United States